Enrique Roldán (1901–1954) was an Argentine stage and film actor. He appeared in twenty four films during his career which spanned the Golden Age of Argentine Cinema. Roldán often played villains, particularly in the films of Manuel Romero.

Selected filmography
 Isabelita (1940)
 Honeymoon in Rio (1940)
 I Want to Be a Chorus Girl (1941)
 You Are My Love (1941)
 The Three Musketeers (1946)
 Valentina (1950)

References

Bibliography 
 Finkielman, Jorge. The Film Industry in Argentina: An Illustrated Cultural History. McFarland, 24 Dec 2003.

External links 
 

1901 births
1954 deaths
Argentine male film actors
Argentine male stage actors
20th-century Argentine male actors